The Gold Coast Historic District is a historic district in Chicago, Illinois.  Part of Chicago's Near North Side community area, it is roughly bounded by North Avenue, Lake Shore Drive, Oak Street, and Clark Street.

The Gold Coast neighborhood grew in the wake of the Great Chicago Fire. In 1882, millionaire Potter Palmer moved to the area from the Prairie Avenue neighborhood on the city's south side.  He filled in a swampy area which later became Lake Shore Drive, and built the Palmer Mansion, a forty-two room castle-like structure designed by Henry Ives Cobb and Charles Sumner Frost. Other wealthy Chicagoans followed Potter into the neighborhood, which became one of the richest in Chicago.

In the late 1980s, the Gold Coast and neighboring Streeterville comprised the second most-affluent neighborhood in the United States, behind Manhattan's Upper East Side. Today, the neighborhood is a mixture of mansions, row houses, and high-rise apartments. Highlights include the Astor Street District and the James Charnley House.

The district was added to the National Register of Historic Places in 1978.

The nearby East Lake Shore Drive District and parts of northern Streeterville and the Magnificent Mile near the lake also may be considered part of the Gold Coast (such as the area around the 860-880 Lake Shore Drive Apartments), even if not technically in the historic designation.  The mayor's office map extends the Gold Coast south to the area of Northwestern University's Chicago campus.

As of 2011, Gold Coast ranks as the seventh-richest urban neighborhood in the United States with a median household income of $153,358.

Photos

Historical images of Chicago's Gold Coast can be found in Explore Chicago Collections, a digital repository made available by Chicago Collections archives, libraries and other cultural institutions in the city.

Education

Chicago Public Schools (CPS) operates public schools serving the community. Ogden International School of Chicago has its East Campus, which houses elementary school, in the Gold Coast.

Residents of the Gold Coast are zoned to Ogden School for grades K-8, while for high school they are zoned to Lincoln Park High School. Any graduate from Ogden's 8th grade program may automatically move on to the 9th grade at Ogden, but students who did not graduate from Ogden's middle school must apply to the high school.

The Latin School of Chicago is also located in the Gold Coast and is one of the nation's most prestigious K-12 private schools.

Notable residents
Gold Coast has a long tradition of being home to some of the nation's wealthiest and influential residents. These include:
J.B. Pritzker – businessman, venture capitalist, politician and current Governor of Illinois.
Lori Greiner – inventor, entrepreneur, and television personality
Vince Vaughn – actor
Lee Miglin - real estate developer

References

External links

Gold Coast Neighbors Association

Central Chicago
Neighborhoods in Chicago
Historic districts in Chicago
Residential buildings on the National Register of Historic Places in Chicago
1882 establishments in Illinois
Populated places established in 1882
Historic districts on the National Register of Historic Places in Illinois